Mallappuram Mallappuram, or மல்லபுரம் Mallapuram, or மள்ளப்புரம் Maḷḷappuram) is a village in Madurai district, India.

Geography 
Mallappuram is in Madurai district, Periaiyur Taluk, near Usilampatti to M. Kallupatti (Elumalai).

Mallappuram (Tamil : மல்லப்புரம் மல்லபுரம் மள்ளப்புரம் Mallapuram ) is a village nearly 23 km from Usilampatti, 20 km from பேரையூர், 63 km from ம‌துரை. மல்லபுரம் மதுரை மற்றும் தேனி மாவட்டத்தின் எல்லையில் அமைந்துள்ள கிராமம். இதன் வழ மல்லபுரம் மயிலாடும்பாறை சாலை அமைந்துள்ளது

Educational institutions in the village include Thiruvalluvar Teacher Training Institute, B,Ed, M.Ed Colleges, Tamil Thai Teacher Training Institute, and Thiruvalluvar Polytechnic College.

Demographics 
As of 2001, Mallappuram had a population of 11,030. Males constituted 50% of the population and females 50%. Mallapuram had an average literacy rate of 56%, lower than the national average of 59.5%: male literacy is 67%, and female literacy is 45%. In Mallappuram, 10% of the population is under 6 years of age. Most of the population are business people.

Villages in Madurai district